Tim-Robin Lihaug (born 17 September 1992 in Bergen) is a light heavyweight Norwegian boxer who turned pro in 2012.

On 29 November 2014, he became the WBO Youth World Champion.

On 23 March 2019, he became the WBO European Champion and the IBA Intercontinental Champion in his home city in Norway.

After boxing in Grieghallen less than a week before the COVID-19 pandemic really hit Norway, he was unable to get new matches because of the prolonged pandemic. In January 2022 Lihaug announced that he would probably retire.

Professional boxing record

References

1992 births
Living people
Norwegian male boxers
Light-heavyweight boxers
Sportspeople from Bergen
21st-century Norwegian people